MAST@FIU Biscanye Bay Campus, also known as MAST@FIU, and MAST@ FIU BBC, is a public magnet secondary school. The school is located in North Miami, Florida, on Florida International University's Biscayne Bay Campus. It is the fourth MAST school to open, after MAST Academy, MAST Medical @ Homestead, and José Martí MAST.

In 2013, it was claimed that opening the school would depend on funding from the community.

On August 19, 2013, MAST@FIU opened.

The school takes advantage of its location on the bay, similar to the Virginia Key MAST Academy. MAST@FIU claims that it offers the advanced studies of a public magnet, while shifting the setting to a university atmosphere.

References

Educational institutions established in 2013
2013 establishments in Florida
Education in Miami
Florida International University